Tracy A. Robinson is the president and chief executive officer of the Canadian National Railway. She was elevated to the position in January 2022. She formally took her position as CEO on February 28, 2022. In choosing Robinson CN prevailed over TCI Fund Management, which had fought to change the members of the board and had a different choice for CN's CEO. She previously had been an energy executive and had been an official at CN's longtime rival, the Canadian Pacific Railway.

Early life
She earned a bachelors of communication at the University of Saskatchewan and a masters of business administration at the University of Pennsylvania's Wharton School of Business.

Career
Robinson had worked for 27 years at Canadian Pacific including holding the position of vice president of marketing and sales and vice president/treasurer. In the interim between her years at Canadian Pacific and her joining Canadian National she started holding executive positions at TC Energy in 2014. Her positions included executive vice president and she was president of TC Energy's Transcanada natural gas pipelines. In her work at Transcanada, she was responsible for  all commercial, business development, project, regulatory and operating functions for the Canada Gas business unit. This included work on the largest system for handling natural gas in the Western Canadian Sedimentary Basin and the Canadian mainline pipeline delivering Canadian gas to the United States.

In her ascending to the CEO position, Robinson succeeded Jean-Jacques 'J.J.' Ruest.

Outside activities
Aside from her professional work, she is member of the Dean's Advisory council at the Edwards School of Business at the University of Saskatchewan.

References

Canadian chief executives
Canadian National Railway
Canadian National Railway people
Canadian Pacific Railway
Canadian Pacific Railway people
Living people
University of Pennsylvania alumni
University of Saskatchewan alumni
21st-century American railroad executives
21st-century American businesswomen